The 2020 European Fund for Energy, Climate Change and Infrastructure, known as the Marguerite Fund, is a pan-European equity fund that invests in renewables, energy and transport.  It is based in Luxembourg.

Funding 
The Marguerite Fund was established in 2010 by the European Investment Bank, Caisse des dépôts et consignations, Cassa Depositi e Prestiti, Instituto de Crédito Oficial, Kreditanstalt für Wiederaufbau and Powszechna Kasa Oszczędności Bank Polski as part of the European Economic Recovery Plan. Marguerite I launched following the financial crisis in 2010, at a time when investors had little trust in greenfield infrastructure. In Europe, specifically France and Germany, investments were successful following the 170 million fund.  The European Investment Bank (EIB) and the national EU member state promotional banks contributed €705 million to the fund by November 2017, and a private investor in 2018 contributed another 40 million. The European Investment Bank, with the guarantee of European Fund for Strategic Investments, doubled the in Marguerite II to 200 million, marking it as the EU bank's largest investment in a infrastructure fund.

Investments 
The Marguerite Fund has invested in the Butendiek Wind Farm off Germany, the Tychovo and the Kukinia wind farms in Poland. the Thorntonbank Wind Farm off Belgium, Chirnogeni Wind Farm in Romania, Massangis 1 and Toul-Rosières 2 photovoltaic plants in France, the Poznań incineration plant in Poland, the Zagreb International Airport in Croatia, the N17/N18 Motorway project in Ireland, and the Autovía de Arlanzon Motorway in Spain.  In January 2016, the Marguerite Fund became the second largest investor in the Latvian gas company Latvijas Gāze.

Unlike other infrastructure funds, Marguerite Fund II invests in greenfield infrastructure cases before they are fully developed, despite the risk.

References

Infrastructure investment
Private equity firms
European investment banks
Energy in the European Union